The 2004 Los Angeles Dodgers season was the 116th for the franchise in Major League Baseball, and their 47th season in Los Angeles, California. It brought change to the Dodgers as the sale of the franchise to developer Frank McCourt was finalized during spring training. McCourt promptly dismissed General Manager Dan Evans and hired Paul DePodesta to take over the team. That led to a flurry of trade activity as the new group attempted to rebuild the Dodgers in their image.

Despite it all, the Dodgers managed to finish the season in first place in the Western Division of the National League and won their first postseason game since 1988. However they lost the NL Division Series 3–1 to the St. Louis Cardinals.

Offseason
December 13, 2003: Acquired Jeff Weaver, Yhency Brazobán and Brandon Weeden from the New York Yankees for Kevin Brown and cash.
March 29, 2004: Acquired Jason Grabowski from the Oakland Athletics for cash.
March 30, 2004: Acquired Jayson Werth from the Toronto Blue Jays for Jason Frasor.
April 1, 2004: Acquired Cody Ross from the Detroit Tigers for Steve Colyer and cash.
April 3, 2004: Acquired Aaron Looper and Ryan Ketchner from the Seattle Mariners for Jolbert Cabrera.
April 3, 2004: Acquired Antonio Perez from the Tampa Bay Devil Rays for Jason Romano.
April 4, 2004: Acquired Milton Bradley from the Cleveland Indians for Franklin Gutierrez and Andrew Brown.

Regular season

Season standings

National League West

Record vs. opponents

Opening Day lineup

Notable transactions
July 30, 2004: Acquired Brad Penny, Hee-Seop Choi and Bill Murphy from the Florida Marlins for Guillermo Mota, Paul Lo Duca and Juan Encarnación.
July 31, 2004: Acquired Brent Mayne and Steve Finley from the Arizona Diamondbacks for Bill Murphy, Koyie Hill and Reggie Abercrombie.
July 31, 2004: Acquired Henri Stanley from the Boston Red Sox for Dave Roberts.
August 19, 2004: Acquired Elmer Dessens and cash from the Arizona Diamondbacks for Jereme Milons.

Roster

Starting Pitchers stats
Note: G = Games pitched; GS = Games started; IP = Innings pitched; W/L = Wins/Losses; ERA = Earned run average; BB = Walks allowed; SO = Strikeouts; CG = Complete games

Relief Pitchers stats
Note: G = Games pitched; GS = Games started; IP = Innings pitched; W/L = Wins/Losses; ERA = Earned run average; BB = Walks allowed; SO = Strikeouts; SV = Saves

Batting Stats
Note: Pos = Position; G = Games played; AB = At bats; Avg. = Batting average; R = Runs scored; H = Hits; HR = Home runs; RBI = Runs batted in; SB = Stolen bases

2004 National League Division Series
The 2004 National League Division Series was played between the Los Angeles Dodgers and St. Louis Cardinals. St. Louis ended up winning the series 3-1.

Game 1, October 5
Busch Stadium, St. Louis, Missouri

Game 2, October 7
Busch Stadium, St. Louis, Missouri

Game 3, October 9
Dodger Stadium, Los Angeles

Game 4, October 10
Dodger Stadium, Los Angeles

2004 Awards
2004 Major League Baseball All-Star Game
Éric Gagné reserve
Paul Lo Duca reserve
Relief Man of the Year
Éric Gagné
Gold Glove Award
Steve Finley
César Izturis
Silver Slugger Award
Adrián Beltré
National League Player of the Month
Adrián Beltré (September 2004)
National League Player of the Week
Adrián Beltré (June 21–27, 2004)
Steve Finley (Sep. 6–12, 2004)

Farm system

Major League Baseball Draft

The Dodgers selected 52 players in this draft. Of those, nine of them would eventually play Major League baseball. They gained an extra first round pick and a supplemental first round pick as compensation for the loss of free agent pitcher Paul Quantrill.

With their three first round picks, the Dodgers selected left handed pitcher Scott Elbert from Seneca High School, right-handed pitcher Justin Orenduff from Virginia Commonwealth University and second baseman Blake DeWitt from Sikeston High School.  Elbert became a relief pitcher for the Dodgers, but numerous injuries kept him from reaching his potential. Orenduff never reached the Majors, pitching in 131 minor league games through 2011. DeWitt hit .257 in 426 games in the Majors, primarily as a utility player.

References

External links
2004 Los Angeles Dodgers uniform
Los Angeles Dodgers official web site 
Baseball-Reference season page
Baseball Almanac season page

Los Angeles Dodgers seasons
Los Angeles Dodgers
National League West champion seasons